Beyond Silence is a 1996 German film directed by Caroline Link. The film was nominated for the Academy Award for Best Foreign Language Film at the 70th Academy Awards.

Plot
The film tells the story of Lara, who grows up as the daughter of deaf parents, Martin and Kai. Lara herself is hearing and is fluent in sign language. Even as a young child, she serves as an interpreter for her parents in many situations, such as credit negotiations at the bank as well as her own parent–teacher conference, although not always completely truthfully.

Lara receives a clarinet for Christmas from Clarissa, her father's sister and an enthusiastic musician. Lara discovers the world of music, where her parents cannot follow her. In the years that follow, she is discovered to be a talented clarinet player. When 18-year-old Lara wants to study at a music conservatory in Berlin, the family seems to break apart. Lara finds love in Berlin with a teacher of deaf children.

After Kai is killed in a bicycle accident, Lara's grieving father feels abandoned. Lara bounces from her family home, to her aunt's, to her uncle's before returning to her childhood home. The ending seems to reconcile it all: Martin tries to understand the love of music that his daughter feels, and the film comes to a careful reunion between him and Lara.

Cast

Reviews
Beyond Silence has an 83% approval rating on Rotten Tomatoes.
 "A successful film debut of a graduate of the Munich Film Academy. The film is a sensible presentation of the problem of the handicapped as well as the universal theme of the self discovery of a young woman and the plea for understanding and openness about seemingly disproportionate experiences." (film-dienst 25/1996)
 "Whoever would like to find out how loud the snow is and how the sounds of a clarinet can enchant people, should not allow themselves to miss this film: a German production which takes up extraordinary themes across the relationship-comedy and tells the story about saying goodbye to one's childhood with gentle humor and an idiosyncratic aesthetic." (Fischer Film Almanach, 1997)
 "A film that allows silence to become music and has found strength in the balance between laughing and crying, happiness and pain. "Jenseits der Stille" is memorable among German productions, and excellently cast. (Dirk Jasper FilmLexikon)
 "Thanks to good casting for all roles and assured acting performances under its direction, this [film is] a successful journey into the world of the deaf, with all its problems of social integration and family conflict." (FBW Langfilme)

Accolades

See also
 List of submissions to the 70th Academy Awards for Best Foreign Language Film
 List of German submissions for the Academy Award for Best Foreign Language Film
 List of films featuring the deaf and hard of hearing
 Khamoshi: The Musical (1996), Indian film with similar plot.

References

Book

External links
Ungewöhnliche Dreharbeiten - Bayerischer Rundfunk
Filmeintrag auf omdb.org with underground information
 

1996 films
Films set in Germany
Films set in Berlin
1990s German-language films
German Sign Language films
German drama films
1996 drama films
Films directed by Caroline Link
1990s German films